Giorgio Bolognetti or Gregorio Bolognetti (22 December 1595 – 17 January 1680) was a Roman Catholic prelate who served as Bishop of Rieti (1639–1660), Apostolic Nuncio to France (1634–1639), Apostolic Nuncio to Florence (1631–1634), Bishop of Ascoli Satriano (1630–1631).

Biography
Giorgio Bolognetti was born in Rome, Italy on 22 December 1595.

On 23 September 1630, he was appointed during the papacy of Pope Urban VIII as Bishop of Ascoli Satriano.
On 7 October 1630, he was consecrated bishop by Luigi Caetani, Cardinal-Priest of Santa Pudenziana, with Antonio Ricciulli, Bishop Emeritus of Belcastro, and Benedetto Landi, Bishop of Fossombrone, serving as co-consecrators. 
On 8 November 1631, he was appointed during the papacy of Pope Urban VIII as Apostolic Nuncio to Florence.
On 26 March 1634, he was appointed during the papacy of Pope Urban VIII as Apostolic Nuncio to France.
On 28 February 1639, he was appointed during the papacy of Pope Urban VIII as Bishop of Rieti.
He served as Bishop of Rieti until his resignation in 1660.  He died on 17 January 1680.

Episcopal succession
While bishop, he was the principal co-consecrator of:
Scipione Pannocchieschi d'Elci, Bishop of Pienza (1631); and 
Christophoro d'Authier de Sisgau, Titular Bishop of Bethlehem (1651).

References

External links and additional sources
 (for Chronology of Bishops) 
 (for Chronology of Bishops) 
 
 (for Chronology of Bishops)  
 (for Chronology of Bishops)  
 (for Chronology of Bishops) 
 (for Chronology of Bishops) 

17th-century Italian Roman Catholic bishops
Bishops appointed by Pope Urban VIII
1595 births
1680 deaths